The Six O'Clock Show is an Irish evening-time television show on Virgin Media One (formerly known as "TV3"). It is a live show, and provides chat, live music, cooking, entertainment, showbiz and technology updates. It replaced The 7 O'Clock Show as Emmerdale and Coronation Street returned to TV3.

Background
The Six O'Clock Show first began as an early afternoon show live on TV3 then called Late Lunch Live. As part of the revamp of TV3's daytime schedule due to falling audience figures an extended version of Ireland AM and Late Lunch Live replaced The Morning Show. Late Lunch Live premiered on 30 September 2013, airing every Monday to Friday from 14:00. By 2014 the show was moved to a new timeslot of 15:30 to 16:30.  The programme featured in-studio guests, live performances, updates on showbiz, TV, technology, events around the country and general chat with its daily guests.

On 30 January 2015 the TV3 Group confirmed Late Lunch Live would be replaced with The Seven O'Clock Show, which premiered on 16 February 2015. Both presenters of Late Lunch Live joined the new show.

With the refresh and rebrand to The Seven O' Clock Show, Lucy Kennedy and Martin King present the show four days a week with a rotation of presenters on Friday's edition. This includes Ray Foley and Mairead Farrell, or Lousie Duffy and Anton Savage.

Due to the return of Emmerdale and Coronation Street, the show was renamed The 6 O'Clock Show and was pushed back to 18:00. Muireann O'Connell and Martin King are the main hosts.

The Friday evening edition was replaced by Xposé in March 2019, following the cancellation of Xposé the show returned to its usual five nights a week from October 2019.

Presenters
Greg O'Shea (Monday to Friday) 
Karen Koster (Monday to Thursday)
Gráinne Seoige (Friday & cover)
Former presenters 
Martin King (formerly Monday to Thursday) 
Ray Foley (formerly Friday/cover)
Muireann O'Connell (formerly Monday to Friday)
Lucy Kennedy (formerly Monday to Thursday)
Mairead Farrell (formerly on Friday's edition)
Louise Duffy (formerly on Friday's edition)
Anton Savage (formerly on Friday's edition)
Deirdre O'Kane (during Kennedy's maternity  leave)
Samantha Mumba (during Kennedy's maternity leave)
Una Healy (Friday and cover)
Kamal Ibrahim (Friday and cover)
 Brian Dowling (Friday and cover)

Special contributors
Conor Pope – Budgeting and Consumer Affairs
David Atkinson – Online Reporter
Fionnuala Jones – Showbiz
Anna Geary – Sport
Eoghan Doherty – Regional Reporter
Éanna Ní Lamhna – Nature 
Ciara King – Events Reporter
Andy O’Donoghue – Tech Guru
Derry Clarke – Chef
Adrian Martin – Chef
Kevin Dundon – Chef
Stephen & David Flynn (The Happy Pear) – Chef
Yvonne Connolly – Chef
Russell Alford & Patrick Hanlon (GastroGays) – Chef
Aisling Larkin – Chef
Darina Coffey – Chef
Kwanghi Chan – Chef
Graham Herterich (The Cupcake Bloke) – Chef
Gary O'Hanlon – Chef
Gareth Mullins – Chef

On-air identity

References

External links
 

1999 Irish television series debuts
2000s Irish television series
2010s Irish television series
Irish television talk shows
Virgin Media Television (Ireland) original programming